Cornelius Vanderbilt (1794–1877) was an American entrepreneur known as the Commodore.

Cornelius Vanderbilt may also refer to:
Cornelius Jeremiah Vanderbilt (1830–1882), American farmer and gambler, son of the Commodore
Cornelius Vanderbilt II (1843–1899), American socialite and businessman, nephew of the gambler
Cornelius Vanderbilt III (1873–1942), American military officer, inventor, engineer, and yachtsman, son of the socialite
Cornelius Vanderbilt IV (1898–1974), American newspaper publisher, son of the military officer